Love's Victory  is a Jacobean era pastoral drama (c. 1620) by English Renaissance writer Lady Mary Wroth.

Love's Victory may also refer to:

 Love's Victory, a 1658 poem by William Chamberlayne
 Love's Victory, an 1890 poem by John Arthur Blaikie